Philip Dru: Administrator: A Story of Tomorrow, 1920-1935 is a futuristic political novel published in 1912 by Edward Mandell House, an American diplomat, politician, and presidential foreign policy advisor.  The book's author was originally unknown with an anonymous publication, however House's identity was revealed in a speech on the Senate floor by Republican Senator Lawrence Sherman.  According to historians, House highly prized his work and gave a copy of Dru to his closest political ally, Woodrow Wilson, to read while on a trip to Bermuda.

Book reviews
Dru has been the subject of significant historical review and commentary, partly due to its popularity at the time.  John Milton Cooper Jr. writes in his biography of Woodrow Wilson that this political novel is largely ghostwritten.  House biographer Charles E. Neu disagrees with this, noting that within the House Papers there is an original manuscript in House's own writing, with another typed draft that has correcting notes.

Historian Paul Johnson wrote: "Oddly enough, in 1911 he [House] had published a political novel, Philip Dru: Administrator, in which a benevolent dictator imposed a corporate income tax, abolished the protective tariff, and broke up the 'credit trust'—a remarkable adumbration of Woodrow Wilson and his first term."

Billie Jensen, a historian from the University of Kansas noted that "Philip Dru was obviously an expression both of House's ambition and his political dreams and it was an expression of the ideas of the man who had an impressive amount of influence on Woodrow Wilson.  Seldom have the elements of a utopia been implemented so soon as the reforms of Philip Dru were; seldom has a utopian reformer been as influential as House was.  For these reasons, Philip Dru is a significant political document.

Wilson's Secretary of the Interior Franklin K. Lane noted, according to historian Arthur M. Schlesinger Jr., that there were similarities between Wilson's governing style and the writings contained in the novel: "All that book has said should be, comes about slowly, even woman suffrage. The President comes to Philip Dru in the end."

In a book review for The New York Times, Walter Lippmann wrote of the novel and its anonymous author that "if the author is really a man of affairs, this is an extraordinarily interesting book".

Senator Lawrence Y. Sherman talked about the book in congress, noting its substantial influence.  He said: "Here is exhibited the colonel's whole mental viscera. If there be twilight zones in the biography of 1918, the colonel's 312 pages of fiction flashed from the watchtowers of 1912 a searchlight athwart the gloaming so any wayfarer can see everything. Suffice it to know Philip Dru is an autobiography of the colonel himself and solves the Conundrum how to get rid of the Constitution."

Historian Walter A. McDougall compared Philip Dru to the 1933 dystopian film Gabriel Over the White House.

Synopsis
Set in 1920–1935, House's hero leads the democratic western United States in a civil war against the plutocratic East.  After becoming the acclaimed leader of the country, he steps down having restored justice and democracy.  House outlined many additional political beliefs such as:

 Federal Incorporation Act, with government and labor representation on the board of every corporation
 Public service corporations must share their net earnings with government
 Government ownership of all telegraphs
 Government ownership of all telephones
 Government representation in railroad management
 Single term presidency
 Old age pension law reform
 Workmen's insurance law
 Co-operative marketing and land banks
 Free employment bureaus
 8 hour work day, six days a week
 Labor not to be a commodity
 Government arbitration of industrial disputes
 Government ownership of all healthcare

Cast of characters
The book has several characters:  Philip Dru is the main protagonist of the story.  Other characters include Gloria Strawn and her brother Jack Strawn, John Thor, and Senator Selwyn.

References

External links
Project Gutenberg: Philip Dru: Administrator
Google books: Philip Dru: Administrator, PDF download
 

1912 American novels
1912 science fiction novels
American political novels
Novels about revolutionaries
Novels set in the future
Social science fiction
Novels about geopolitics
Utopian novels
Totalitarianism in fiction
Novels about totalitarianism
Progressivism in the United States
Progressive Era in the United States
Novels set in the 1920s
Novels set in the 1930s
Future history